Canton of Vannes may refer to:

 Canton of Vannes-1, Morbihan, Brittany, France
 Canton of Vannes-2, Morbihan, Brittany, France
 Canton of Vannes-3, Morbihan, Brittany, France

See also
 Arrondissement of Vannes, Morbihan, Brittany, France
 Vannes, Morbihan, Brittany, France
 Vannes (disambiguation)